Sir Adam Disappeared is a 1939 mystery thriller novel by the British writer E. Phillips Oppenheim. It was published in the United States by Little, Brown.

Synopsis
While waiting for his lunch the elderly millionaire Sir Adam Blockton vanishes, apparently without trace.

References

Bibliography

 Reilly, John M. Twentieth Century Crime & Mystery Writers. Springer, 2015.
 Server, Lee. Encyclopedia of Pulp Fiction Writers. Infobase Publishing, 2014.

1939 British novels
Novels by E. Phillips Oppenheim
British thriller novels
British mystery novels
Hodder & Stoughton books